The Mulberry River Bridge is a historic bridge, carrying Arkansas Highway 23 over the Mulberry River in northern Franklin County, Arkansas. The bridge was built in 1935, and is one of a small number of surviving multi-span pony truss bridges in the state.

The bridge was listed on the National Register of Historic Places in 2007.

See also
Mulberry River Bridge (Pleasant Hill, Arkansas)

References

Road bridges on the National Register of Historic Places in Arkansas
Bridges completed in 1935
Transportation in Miller County, Arkansas
National Register of Historic Places in Miller County, Arkansas
Parker truss bridges in the United States
1935 establishments in Arkansas